Təzə Alvadı (also, Təzə Alvadıə, Novyye Alvady, and Taza Alvady) is a village and municipality in the Masally Rayon of Azerbaijan.  It has a population of 5,994.

Notable natives 

 Elshad Ahadov Milli parkı — National Hero of Azerbaijan.

References 

Populated places in Masally District